This is a list of baseball players from Netherlands Antilles (Aruba and Curaçao) who have played in Major League Baseball. Hensley Meulens was the first player from the Netherlands Antilles to make it into the Major Leagues. In Bold denotes still active players in the league.

Players

References

Resources
Baseball Reference

 
Netherlands Antilles
List
Major League
Major League Baseball players